Wikipedia's volunteer editor community has the responsibility of fact-checking Wikipedia's content. Wikipedia has been considered one of the major free open source webpages, where millions can read, edit and post their views for free. This can be both on the grounds of dissemination of misinformation and disinformation publications.  

Therefore Wikipedia takes the effort to provide its users with the best possible verified sources. Fact-checking is an aspect of the broader reliability of Wikipedia.  

Various academic studies about Wikipedia and the body of criticism of Wikipedia seek to describe the limits of Wikipedia's reliability, document who and how anyone uses Wikipedia for fact-checking, and what consequences result from the use of Wikipedia as a fact-checking resource. There are several low-quality article types on Wikipedia such as the self-contradictions. These types of articles require improvement and noisy articles can be ruled out.

Major platforms including YouTube and Facebook use Wikipedia's content to confirm the accuracy of the information in their own media collections.

Platforms that fact-check with Wikipedia

Public trust and counter to fake news 
Wikipedia serves as a public resource for access to genuine information. One such is the COVID-19 information, where people can rely on the Wikipedia's page for genuine information. Seeking public trust is a major part of Wikipedia's publication philosophy. Various reader polls and studies have reported public trust in Wikipedia's process for quality control. In general, the public uses Wikipedia to counter fake news.

YouTube fact-checking 

At the 2018 South by Southwest conference, YouTube CEO Susan Wojcicki made the announcement that YouTube was using Wikipedia to fact check videos which YouTube hosts. No one at YouTube had consulted anyone at Wikipedia about this development, and the news at the time was a surprise. The intent at the time was for YouTube to use Wikipedia as a counter to the spread of conspiracy theories. This is done by adding new information boxes under some YouTube videos, thereby, attracting conspiracy theorists.

Facebook fact-checking 
Facebook uses Wikipedia in various ways. Following criticism of Facebook in the context of fake news around the 2016 United States presidential election, Facebook recognized that Wikipedia already had an established process for fact-checking. Facebook's subsequent strategy for countering fake news included using content from Wikipedia for fact-checking. In 2020, Facebook began to provide information from Wikipedia's info boxes into its own general reference knowledge panels to provide objective information.

Fact-checking Wikipedia

Fact-checking is one aspect of the general editing process in Wikipedia. The volunteer community develops a process for reference and fact-checking through community groups such as WikiProject Reliability. Wikipedia has a reputation for cultivating a culture of fact-checking among its editors. Wikipedia's fact-checking process depends on the activity of its volunteer community of contributors, who numbered 200,000 as of 2018.

The development of fact-checking practices is ongoing in the Wikipedia editing community. One development that took years was the 2017 community decision to declare a particular news source, Daily Mail, as generally unreliable as a citation for verifying claims. Through strict guidelines on verifiability, Wikipedia has been combating misinformation. According to Wikipedia guidelines, all articles on Wikipedia's "mainspace" must be verifiable.

Self-contradiction articles 

An experiment was conducted on detecting self-contradiction articles on Wikipedia using a developed model called "Pairwise Contradiction Neural Network" (PCNN). 

Contributions to this experiment are as follows:

 A novel Wikipedia dataset named WikiContradiction was created which is the first dataset for self-contradiction tasks on Wikipedia.
 A novel model PCNN was developed and was fine-tuned via the WikiContradiction dataset.
 The empirical results exhibit the PCNN model's promising performance as well as highlight the most contradicted pairs.
 The compiled WikiContradiction dataset can be used as a training resource for improving Wikipedia's articles.
 This can further contribute to fact-checking and claim verification as well.

Limitations
When Wikipedia experiences vandalism, platforms that reuse Wikipedia's content may republish that vandalized content. Vandalism is prohibited in Wikipedia. 

Wikipedia suggests these steps for inexperienced beginners to handle vandalism: access, revert, warn, watch, and finally report.

In 2018, Facebook and YouTube were major users of Wikipedia for its fact-checking functions, but those commercial platforms were not contributing to Wikipedia's free nonprofit operations in any way. In 2016, journalists described how vandalism in Wikipedia undermines its use as a credible source.

Self-contradiction limitations: The two main limitations of the self-contradiction PCNN model are the subjectivity of self-contradiction and not being able to deal with lengthy documents.

See also 
 Circular reporting on Wikipedia

References

Further consideration

External links
Wikipedia:WikiProject Reliability, the English Wikipedia community project which self-organizes fact-checking

Newswriting
fact-checking